Tengku Ampuan Hajah Rahimah binti Almarhum Sultan Abdul Aziz Langkat (4 August 1929 – 27 June 1993) was the Tengku Ampuan of Selangor, Malaysia during the reign of her husband, Sultan Salahuddin of Selangor.

Biography 
She was born on 4 August 1929, as the posthumous daughter of Paduka Sri Tuanku Sultan Abdul Aziz Abdul Jalil Rahmat Shah ibni al-Marhum Sultan Haji Musa al-Khalid al-Mu'azzam Shah, Sultan of Langkat and Tengku Putri Zahra binti al-Marhum Sultan Alauddin Sulaiman Shah, daughter of Colonel Paduka Sri Sultan Sir Alauddin Sulaiman Shah ibni al-Marhum Yang di-Pertuan Muda Musa, Sultan and Yang di-Pertuan of the State of Selangor Darul Ehsan, GCMG, KCVO.

She married, as his third chronological wife, at Selangor Palace, Kuala Lumpur, on 11 March 1956, Paduka Sri 
Sultan Salehuddin 'Abdu'l Aziz Shah Alhaj ibni al-Marhum Sultan Hishamuddin Alam Shah Alhaj, by the Grace of Allah, Sultan and Ruler of the State of Selangor Dar ul-Ihsan and all its dependencies.

She was appointed as Raja Puan Muda on 13 May 1958, and crowned as Tengku Ampuan at Alam Shah Palace, Klang on 28 June 1961. She was, hence, named Tengku Ampuan Hajjah Rahimah binti al-Marhum Sultan 'Abdu'l Aziz 'Abdu'l Jalil Rahmat Shah.
 
At the morning of 6:00 am she was found dead in bed. 
She had died in her sleep at 3:47 am on 23 June 1993 and was buried in the Royal Mausoleum near Sultan Sulaiman  Mosque in Klang.

Issue 
The royal couple had two daughters: 
 Tengku Puteri Nur Marina (born 15 October 1957).
 Tengku Puteri Nur Zehan (born 18 November 1958).

Legacy
Several buildings were named after her;
Tengku Ampuan Rahimah Hospital (In Malay; Hospital Tengku Ampuan Rahimah a.k.a. HTAR)- a general hospital of Klang which was opened in 1985.
SMK Tengku Ampuan Rahimah - a secondary school located in Klang.
Sekolah Agama Menengah Tinggi Tengku Ampuan Rahimah (SAMTTAR) - an Islamic secondary school in Banting, Selangor.

Honours 
She was awarded:

Honours of Selangor 
  : 
  First Class of the Royal Family Order of Selangor (DK I) (1963)
  Knight Grand Commander of the Order of the Crown of Selangor (SPMS) - Datin Seri
  Knight Grand Companion of the Order of Sultan Salahuddin Abdul Aziz Shah (SSSA) - Datin Seri

Honours of Malaysia and sultanates 
  : 
  Knight Grand Commander of the Order of the Crown of Kelantan or "Star of Muhammad" (SPMK) - Dato'

References 

Selangor royal consorts
1993 deaths
Malaysian people of Bugis descent
Rahimah, Tengku Ampuan
First Classes of Royal Family Order of Selangor
Malaysian people of Malay descent
Malaysian Muslims
Indonesian Muslims
Indonesian people of Malay descent
Royal House of Selangor